The Battle of Golpejera also known as Golpejar, was an internecine battle among Christian kingdoms fought in early January 1072. King Sancho II of Castile (the Strong) defeated the forces of his brother Alfonso VI of León (the Brave) near Carrión de los Condes. It is notable as being one of the battles in which El Cid participated.

Background 
In the 11th century, the three kingdoms of Castile, León and Galicia had been united under a single ruler, King Ferdinand I of León, known as The Great. But his elaborate plans for succession led to years of infighting among siblings.

If Ferdinand had followed the Navarrese Succession Law, (Ferdinand was the son of Sancho III of Navarre), then his elder son, Sancho of Castile, should have receive either all or the most of the inheritance. The nobility of León, however, saw itself as the supreme heir of the ancient Hispanic-Gothic kingdom, and balked at rule under a Castilian monarch. Castile until recently had been merely frontier county of León. Ultimately, in a King Lear-like compromise, Ferdinand elected to divide among his sons his domains into three kingdoms. Alfonso would inherit León; García, Galicia; and Sancho, Castile. To his two daughters, Urraca and Elvira, he granted the towns of Zamora and Toro.

After his father's death, Sancho made claims on his brother's domains, and invaded the neighboring Christian kingdoms.

Results and aftermath 

Sancho II of Castile defeated his brother, Alfonso VI of León over the Carrión River (9 miles south of the city of Santa Maria de Carrion – the capital of the Beni-Gomez – Christian counts of Saldaña, Liebana, Carrion, and Zamora). The battle started at dawn, and after a hard fight the Castilians were driven from the field. Rodrigo Díaz de Vivar (El Cid) managed to encourage both King and army, and lead them in a new attack the following morning. Alfonso was captured, but released into exile, where he sought refuge in Toledo, which was then in Moorish hands. Despite this outcome, Sancho's victory was short-lived; he was assassinated by treachery while besieging Leonese nobles who had sequestered with Sancho's sister Urraca in the walled town of Zamora. Alfonso was able to return and rule the joint Kingdom of León-Castile.

In modern culture 
This battle is featured as part of the series of the El Cid campaign in Age of Empires II: The Conquerors Expansion as "Brother Against Brother".

External links
 Short synopsis of the Battle of Golepejera and Llantada
 Date of Golpejera

Golpejera
11th century in the Kingdom of León
Golpejera
Golpejera
Golpejera
1072 in Europe
11th century in Castile
Golpejera
History of the province of Palencia